Kees Boot (born 26 March 1970) is a Dutch actor. He is known for playing roles in many films, television series and theatrical productions.

Career 

Early in his career, he became known for playing the role of 'John the manager' in a Cup-a-Soup commercial and for playing Johnny in the television series All Stars. He also appeared in the 1999 film Mates, the 2007 film Moordwijven, the 2008 film De Brief voor de Koning and the 2013 film The Price of Sugar. In 2011 and 2012, he played the role of Leo in the television series SpangaS. He also played roles in the television series Baantjer, De afdeling, Overspel and Flikken Rotterdam. In 2009, he voiced the character of Jerom in the comedy adventure film Luke and Lucy: The Texas Rangers. In 2010, he appeared as police officer in the dark comedy horror film Sint.

In 2013, he appeared in the fifteenth season of the reality television show Expeditie Robinson. In 2019, he appeared in the speed skating television show De ijzersterkste.

In 2020, he appeared in Detective Van der Valk, a Dutch remake of the British television series Van der Valk. In 2021, he played the role of traitor in the television game show De Verraders.

, he is scheduled to appear in the Dutch adaptation of Matilda the Musical. , he is scheduled to appear in the musical 14 de musical about Dutch footballer and manager Johan Cruyff.

Awards 

In 2003, he won the Arlecchino award (for best male supporting actor) for his role in the play Popcorn by Ben Elton.

References

External links 

 

Living people
1970 births
Place of birth missing (living people)
Dutch male actors
Dutch male film actors
Dutch male television actors
Dutch male stage actors
21st-century Dutch male actors